Mount Joy station may refer to:

Mount Joy GO Station in Markham, Ontario, Canada
Mount Joy station (Pennsylvania) in Mount Joy, Pennsylvania, US